The following lists events that happened during 2014 in Sierra Leone.

Incumbents
President: Ernest Bai Koroma
Vice President: Samuel Sam-Sumana

Events

March
 March 24 - An outbreak of Ebola virus which has killed at least 59 people in Guinea continues its spread, entering Liberia and threatens to spread to Sierra Leone.
 March 31 - The Ebola outbreak is reported to have made several cases in Sierra Leone.

May
 May 26 - WHO reports the first cases and deaths of Ebola in Sierra Leone, in Kailahun District.
 May 29 - Medical teams from the World Health Organization and Doctors Without Borders arrive in Sierra Leone to deal with an outbreak of Ebola virus.

June
 June 6 - The World Health Organization estimates that an outbreak of the Ebola virus has killed more than 200 people in West Africa.
 June 11 - Sierra Leone closed its borders with Liberia and Guinea and closed a number of schools around the country. On 30 July, the government began to deploy troops to enforce quarantines.
 June 20 - The WHO announces up to 158 Ebola cases in Sierra Leone. In addition to Kailahun District, cases were also reported in Kenema, Kambia, Port Loko, and Western Area Rural districts.

July
 July 14 - Ebola virus epidemic in West Africa
 The Bo District reports its first Ebola case.
 The Ebola virus outbreak in West Africa continues to get worse with the death toll now exceeding 500.
 July 17 - The number of EVD cases in Sierra Leone surpasses those of Liberia and Guinea at 442.
 July 18 - WHO regards the disease trend in Sierra Leone and Liberia as "serious" with 67 new cases and 19 deaths reported to date.
 July 25 - The first case of Ebola in Freetown is recorded. She was taken by her relatives from a hospital.
 July 29 - Ebola virus epidemic in West Africa
 ASKY Airlines suspends flights to Liberia and Sierra Leone as the death toll from the Ebola outbreak reaches 672.
 Sheik Umar Khan, the doctor who was leading the fight against the disease in Sierra Leone, dies of the Ebola virus.
 July 30 - The Sierra Leone government allowed the deployment of troops to maintain Ebola quarantines.
 July 31 - Ebola virus epidemic in West Africa
 The World Health Organization announces a US$100 million emergency response plan to combat the outbreak, which has killed at least 729 people.
 The Peace Corps withdraws all volunteers from Liberia, Sierra Leone and Guinea, citing Ebola risks.

August
 August 1 - Liberia and Sierra Leone declare a state of emergency in response to the Ebola virus disease by sending in troops and ordering the closure of schools and markets and the quarantining of affected communities.
 August 4 - The World Health Organization estimates that the death toll from the Ebola virus outbreak has risen to 887.
 August 6 - The World Health Organization reports that 932 have died from the latest outbreak of the Ebola virus with a man reportedly dying of the disease in Jeddah, Saudi Arabia after a business trip to Sierra Leone.

October
 October 14 - 800 Sierra Leone peacekeepers due to relieve a contingent deployed in Somalia were placed under quarantine when one of the soldiers tested positive for Ebola.
 October 16 - The Emergency Operations Center announced two Ebola cases in the Koinadugu district in the far north. This marks the arrival of cases in every district in the country.
 October 21 - Riots broke out in the Kono district to prevent the quarantine of a 90-year-old woman suspected of having EVD; the youths are reportedly angry that there are no treatment centers in the diamond-rich Kono district. A daytime curfew is imposed.

Deaths

January
 January 26 - Tom Nyuma

March
 March 13 - Ahmad Tejan Kabbah
 March 16 - Yulisa Pat Amadu Maddy

July
 July 29 - Sheik Umar Khan

References

 
Sierra Leone
Sierra Leone
Years of the 21st century in Sierra Leone
2010s in Sierra Leone